Erva Minerva Giddings (born 17 January 1986) is a Guyanese cricketer who plays for Guyana as a left-arm medium bowler. In 2016, she played two One Day Internationals for the West Indies.

Career
Giddings was first named in a West Indies squad for the 2008 tour of Pakistan, which was later scrapped due to security concerns.

She was selected in the West Indies squad for the home WODI series against England in 2016. During the home series, she eventually made her WODI debut at the age of 30 in the first match of the five match series.

References

External links
 
 

1986 births
Living people
Guyanese women cricketers
West Indian women cricketers
West Indies women One Day International cricketers